Tempsford railway station was a railway station built by the Great Northern Railway to serve the village of Tempsford in Bedfordshire, England.

History

A station between these, named Tempsford, was opened on 1 January 1863.

The station closed on 5 November 1956.

Potential reopening

In January 2019, the East West Railway Company announced a number of options for a new route for the BedfordCambridge sector of their planned OxfordCambridge railway line. In January 2020, the company announced that it had selected a route that  would cross the ECML "in the Tempsford area", bypassing both Sandy railway station and St Neots railway station. The Company has not formally decided if East West Rail will use the old location or a new site, However in March 2021, the East West Railway Company opened an 'informal consultation' on proposals for the Central section’s route alignment and thus the location of this station. Two sites are considered, one just north of the original station and the other, "St Neots South", a mile or so north of it: the latter is preferred.

Route

Notes

References

Disused railway stations in Bedfordshire
Former Great Northern Railway stations
Railway stations in Great Britain opened in 1863
Railway stations in Great Britain closed in 1956
East West Rail